Creonpyge is a Neotropical genus of firetips in the family Hesperiidae. The genus is monotypic containing the single species Creonpyge creon found in Costa Rica and Colombia.

Subspecies 
 C. c. creon 
 C. c. liliana 
 C. c. taylori

References

Natural History Museum Lepidoptera genus database

Hesperiidae
Hesperiidae of South America
Hesperiidae genera